The 2016 Atlantic Sun Conference baseball tournament was held at Ken Dugan Field at Stephen Lee Marsh Stadium on the campus of Lipscomb University in Nashville, Tennessee, from May 25 through 28.  Sixth-seeded  won their seventh tournament championship and claimed the Atlantic Sun Conference's automatic bid to the 2016 NCAA Division I baseball tournament.

Format and seeding
The 2016 tournament was a double-elimination tournament in which the top six of the conference's eight members participated.  Seeds were determined based on conference winning percentage from the round-robin regular season.

Bracket and results
{{6Team2ElimA

| RD1-seed1=1
| RD1-team1=
| RD1-score1=7
| RD1-seed2=6
| RD1-team2=
| RD1-score2=13

| RD1-seed3=2
| RD1-team3=
| RD1-score3=12
| RD1-seed4=5
| RD1-team4=
| RD1-score4=6

| RD1-seed5=3
| RD1-team5=
| RD1-score5=8
| RD1-seed6=4
| RD1-team6=
| RD1-score6=10

| RD2-seed1=6
| RD2-team1=Stetson
| RD2-score1=9
| RD2-seed2=3
| RD2-team2=Jacksonville
| RD2-score2=7

| RD2-seed3=2
| RD2-team3=North Florida
| RD2-score3=1
| RD2-seed4=4
| RD2-team4=Lipscomb
| RD2-score4=0

| RD2-seed5=1
| RD2-team5=Kennesaw State
| RD2-score5=0
| RD2-seed6=5
| RD2-team6=Florida Gulf Coast
| RD2-score6=6

| RD3-seed1=6
| RD3-team1=Stetson
| RD3-score1=7
| RD3-seed2=2
| RD3-team2=North Florida
| RD3-score2=6

| RD3-seed3=5
| RD3-team3=Florida Gulf Coast
| RD3-score3=8
| RD3-seed4=4
| RD3-team4=Lipscomb
| RD3-score4=6

| RD4-seed1=2
| RD4-team1=North Florida
| RD4-score1=2
| RD4-seed2=5
| RD4-team2=Florida Gulf Coast
| RD4-score2=3| RD5-seed1=6
| RD5-team1=Stetson| RD5-score1a=5| RD5-score1b=—
| RD5-seed2=5
| RD5-team2=Florida Gulf Coast
| RD5-score2a=4
| RD5-score2b=—
}}

All-Tournament Team
The following players were named to the All-Tournament Team.

Most Valuable PlayerCory Reid''' was named Tournament Most Valuable Player.  Reid was a third baseman for Stetson who drove in 8 runs and recorded six extra base hits for the tournament.

References

ASUN Conference Baseball Tournament
Tournament
Atlantic Sun Conference baseball tournament
Atlantic Sun baseball tournament